David Volz (born May 2, 1962) is a retired American pole vaulter, who finished fifth at the 1992 Summer Olympics in Barcelona. In addition, he won a bronze medal at the 1985 Summer Universiade. With 5.75 meters in 1982, Volz and 
Jean-Michel Bellot shared the number one spot on the top performers list that year.

His name is memorialized for creating a technique, now illegal, of steadying or even replacing the bar while still in mid-air to prevent it from falling off, known as "Volzing".

He now resides in Bloomington, Indiana, where he is vice president of Cook, Inc. He is married to Marci Endris Volz, who teaches at Bloomington High School South. His three sons, Drake, Drew, and Deakin all pole vaulted for Bloomington High School South.

References

1982 Year List
IU Bio

1962 births
Living people
American male pole vaulters
Athletes (track and field) at the 1992 Summer Olympics
Olympic track and field athletes of the United States
Universiade medalists in athletics (track and field)
Universiade bronze medalists for the United States

Track and field athletes from Indiana